Thomas G. Nicholls (12 October 1931 – 31 July 2021) was an English boxer, who won the silver medal representing Great Britain in the featherweight division (– 57 kg) at the 1956 Summer Olympics in Melbourne, Australia.

Biography
Nicholls was born at South Elmsall, Yorkshire, in 1931, son of Jack, a miner, who moved with his family to Wellington, Shropshire when Thomas was aged seven or eight.

He won the 1951 and 1952 Amateur Boxing Association British bantamweight titles and the 1955 and 1956 featherweight titles, when boxing out of the Slough Centre ABC, when boxing out of the Royal Air Force BC and the Sankeys ABC respectively.

He competed at the 1952 and 1956 Olympic Games, reaching the final in 1956, where he was defeated by Vladimir Safronov of the Soviet Union. He also competed at the 1952 Summer Olympics, where he was beaten in the second round by eventual gold medalist Pentti Hämäläinen from Finland.

It was at Wellington he began training in his sport at Sankey's boxing club. He retired from professional boxing in 1957. He was living at Brandlee, Dawley at the time of his Olympic appearances but later returned to live in Wellington. 

He married in 1955 June Clift, who predeceased him. They had a son, Mark, and daughter, Carol, who survived him. He died at Lightmoor View Care Home in Telford, Shropshire in July 2021 aged 89. His funeral took place at Emstrey Crematorium, Shrewsbury, on 19 August following.

Olympic results
1952 (as a Bantamweight)
Lost to Pentti Hämäläinen (Finland) 3-0

1956 (as a Featherweight)
1st round bye
Defeated Noel Hazard (Australia) points
Defeated Shinetsu Suzuki (Japan) points
Defeated Pentti Hämäläinen (Finland) points
Lost to Vladimir Safronov (Soviet Union) points

Amateur accomplishments
1951 ABA Bantamweight champion
1952 ABA Bantamweight champion
1955 European Featherweight Champion in West Berlin
1955 ABA Featherweight champion
1956 ABA Featherweight champion

References

 databaseOlympics

1931 births
2021 deaths
People from Wellington, Shropshire
Sportspeople from Shropshire
People from West Yorkshire
Featherweight boxers
Boxers at the 1952 Summer Olympics
Boxers at the 1956 Summer Olympics
Olympic boxers of Great Britain
Olympic silver medallists for Great Britain
Olympic medalists in boxing
English male boxers
Medalists at the 1956 Summer Olympics
English Olympic medallists